The Famous Woman (German: Die berühmte Frau) is a 1927 German silent drama film directed by Robert Wiene and starring Lili Damita, Fred Solm and Warwick Ward. It was based on the play Die Tänzerin by Melchior Lengyel, who also wrote the film's screenplay. While performing in Barcelona, a dancer falls in love with a Spanish aristocrat. He proposes marriage to her providing she give up her profession. She agrees and the wedding preparations begin. When her troupe returns to Spain, however, she is drawn back to her true calling as a dancer and her aristocratic lover reluctantly allows her to go free. Damita's performance was particularly praised, as was the cinematography of Otto Kanturek who had done location shooting in Barcelona.

Cast
 Lili Damita as Sonja Litowskaja 
 Fred Solm as Alfredo de Cavalcante 
 Warwick Ward as Gerald 
 Lissy Arna as Zofe bei Sonja 
 Alexander Granach as Diener bei Alfredo 
 Arnold Korff as Der Herzog v. Olivarez 
 Mathilde Sussin as Mutter des Alfredo 
 Alexander Murski as Vater des Alfredo 
 Nikolaus von Lovrie

References

Bibliography
 Jung, Uli & Schatzberg, Walter. Beyond Caligari: The Films of Robert Wiene. Berghahn Books, 1999.

External links

Films of the Weimar Republic
1927 films
German silent feature films
German drama films
Films directed by Robert Wiene
German films based on plays
Films set in Barcelona
1927 drama films
Films produced by Arnold Pressburger
German black-and-white films
Silent drama films
1920s German films
1920s German-language films